Homo Homini (Latin: "A human to another human") is the first monument in Europe to commemorate the victims of the September 11 attacks in the United States. It is located in Kielce in Poland. The monument was designed by Adam Myjak and was unveiled on September 11, 2006, on the fifth anniversary of the attacks. During the opening ceremony, George W. Bush's letter to citizens of Kielce was read out, and students from Kielce schools lit up grave candles. Each grave candle was inscribed with information, giving a single victim's name and occupation.

The monument consists of two seven-meter pillars, placed perpendicularly, each leaning towards the other, criss-crossed by two planes. Plates with the names of the cities where the terrorist attacks took place, are screwed to one of the pillars.

See also 
 Homo homini lupus
 Memorials and services for the September 11 attacks

References 

Memorials for the September 11 attacks
2006 sculptures
Monuments and memorials in Poland
Buildings and structures in Kielce